"Lost in My Mind" is a song by Australian alternative dance group Rüfüs Du Sol, released on 5 September 2018, as the third single from the group's third studio album Solace.

The group wrote the song during a two-day trip to the fabled Joshua Tree desert in California. The group told Zane Lowe: "We went for a few little wonders in the desert, like on these big rock outcrops, and found some lyrics for a few of the other songs... and it's scary, man, it's scary. I mean that's what the song is about a little bit, just being content with like -- we've had some experiences out in the desert, just sort of losing some of your friends and just being like, 'You know what, I'm sweet.'"

The music video was released on 28 November 2018.

Reception
Sose Fuamoli from Triple J described "Lost in My Mind" as "bringing a refreshed edge to the house music [Rüfüs Du Sol] have become known for crafting; they're definitely in a creative space that veers gleefully towards ideas of escape and an unknown atmosphere."

EDM Identity said "Featuring analog sound design and vocals that evoke escapist emotions, we can't get enough of the distorted, gritty feel of 'Lost In My Mind'".

John Ochoa from Billboard said: "'Lost in My Mind' revisits the deep club music vibe of the previously-released Solace singles via its slow-burning synths, ghostly, tribal-like vocal samples and an otherworldly breakdown."

Track listing

Charts

Certifications

Release history

References

2018 songs
2018 singles
Rüfüs Du Sol songs